Barka Deh or Barkadeh may refer to:
 Bala Mahalleh-ye Barka Deh
 Barka Deh-e Pain